Group 1 of the 2017 UEFA European Under-21 Championship qualifying competition consisted of six teams: Czech Republic, Belgium, Montenegro, Moldova, Latvia, and Malta. The composition of the nine groups in the qualifying group stage was decided by the draw held on 5 February 2015.

The group was played in home-and-away round-robin format. The group winners qualified directly for the final tournament, while the runners-up advanced to the play-offs if they were one of the four best runners-up among all nine groups (not counting results against the sixth-placed team).

Standings

Matches
Times are CEST (UTC+2) for dates between 29 March and 24 October 2015 and between 27 March and 29 October 2016, for other dates times are CET (UTC+1).

Goalscorers
10 goals

 Patrik Schick

6 goals

 Aleš Čermák

4 goals

 Youri Tielemans

3 goals

 Václav Černý
 Jevgēņijs Kazačoks
 Vukan Savićević

2 goals

 Theo Bongonda
 Dennis Praet
 Jakub Jankto
 Vladislavs Gutkovskis
 Ryan Camenzuli
 Luke Montebello
 Dan Spătaru
 Aleksandar Boljević
 Luka Đorđević
 Vladimir Jovović

1 goal

 Timothy Castagne
 Julien De Sart
 Björn Engels
 Michaël Heylen
 Nathan Kabasele
 Joris Kayembe
 Antonín Barák
 Milan Havel
 Marek Havlík
 Robert Hrubý
 Lukáš Juliš
 Stanislav Klobása
 Tomáš Souček
 Antonijs Černomordijs
 Dāvis Ikaunieks
 Dmitrijs Klimaševičs
 Ilja Šadčins
 Ingars Stuglis
 Jean Borg
 Jurgen Degabriele
 Jake Grech
 Joseph Mbong
 Dinu Graur
 Eugeniu Rebenja
 Serghei Svinarenco
 Dan Taras
 Marko Janković
 Nemanja Kartal
 Dušan Lagator
 Momcilo Raspopović

1 own goal

 Michaël Heylen (against Malta)
 Milan Havel (against Moldova)
 Kristaps Zommers (against Moldova)
 Artiom Rozgoniuc (against Czech Republic)

References

External links
Standings and fixtures at UEFA.com

Group 1